is a Japanese magical girl/military manga series written by Makoto Fukami and illustrated by Seigo Tokiya. Naoya Tamura is the series' military advisor. It was serialized in Square Enix's seinen manga magazine Monthly Big Gangan from June 2015 to February 2021, with its chapters collected in fourteen tankōbon volumes. The series is published in North America by Seven Seas Entertainment.

An anime television series adaptation by Liden Films aired from January to March 2019; the anime series is licensed in North America under Crunchyroll-Funimation partnership.

Plot
When a dangerous race of beasts known as the Disas attacked, spirits from another world formed an alliance with Earth and granted certain girls the power to become magical girls to fight against them. Three years after the war against the Disas, one of the magical girls, Asuka Otori, is trying to return to living a normal life. However, Disas Bears reappear from an unknown source, leading Asuka to come out of retirement and join a squadron of magical girls to fight this new threat.

Characters

Magical Five
Originally, a squadron of 11 magical girls which took part in the war with the Disas. The Legendary Five represents the survivors of that war. The squad's motto was: "Who laughs last, laughs best..."

 

 The former leader of the magical girls who fought against the Disas three years ago. She tries to live a normal life to get over her trauma of the war, including her parents' death at the hands of the Disas, but is dragged back into the fray by the new threat. Her magical device is a karambit which can be extended to a sword that can cut through any magical defense at the cost of a lot of magic power.
 

Asuka's close friend who is attached to the General Research Division #2 as a Magical Warfare Research Officer. She is able to heal wounds and use a giant syringe to poison enemies. She holds a strong attachment to Asuka who saved her from severe bullying, to the point of unstable obsession, which she mostly keeps to herself while trying to win over Asuka in an acceptable way. She hates the team's moniker of "Magical Five" as it means the public fails to realize that the team was once much bigger and the "Magical Five" are only the survivors of the war. Despite her title as a "Medic," she is also an interrogation specialist well-versed in the practice of torture.
 

An American Sergeant Major with Joint Special Operations Command (JSOC), who works alongside military intelligence agents ISA Aaron and ISA Julia. She is so far the only magical girl who revealed her identity to the public. Her magical device is a derringer, which can turn into different guns. She is at odds with Tamara for being too serious, referring to her as "Rusky".
 

A Russian who specializes in wide-area suppression, she has a magical lighter that can turn into a flamethrower, thus her "Phoenix" moniker. She is at odds with Mia for being too laid back, calling her "Texas girl". She serves as a magical girl because of her sister, later revealed to be an illusion the Russian general staff at the Zavolzhsky weapons testing site use with a fantasy-granting device to brainwash Tamara with the intent to use her until she dies in battle.
 

China's Two Headed Dragon, a Chinese who fights using magical nunchaku and is currently keeping a low profile. She is now a freelance mercenary living in Thailand and has changed her appearance through plastic surgery. She is aware of the recent events and laments that she could not fight alongside her teammates, but has no intention of joining them.

A mouse-class fairy who works alongside Asuka and the other magical girls. Sacchuu can link senses with other magical girls and analyze enemies. His primary weapon is spiked brass knuckles but has also used a pistol and grenades.

Asuka's former commander and a Magical Girl from France. She was killed during the War with the Disas; passing on leadership to Asuka before succumbing to her injuries.

Babel Brigade
 A mysterious organization and terrorist cell who have allied with the Disas against humanity. At least two are illegal magical girls in the organization.

A masked Magical Girl and the leader of the Babel Brigade terrorist cell. She is regularly called Queen by her subordinates. She has a resemblance to someone Asuka knows. It is later revealed that it was Francine, who had somehow survived. She is killed in a suicide attack by Mia Cyrus.
 / 

A terrorist Magical Girl who kidnaps Asuka's friend, Nozomi, to lure other Magical Girls to her. She also is a weapons dealer and assassin. Her magical device is a pair of scissors, which grows massive after she transforms. The weapon can separate and act as a pair of swords. Thematically, she is a darker mirror of Kurumi, obsessively devoted to the Brigadier and similarly fond of using torture.

 A massive cyborg who was formerly a Somali child soldier who was severely injured in battle. He was rescued by Brigadier and Abigail and augmented with a cybernetic body, made to kill Magical Girls. He is responsible for giving Chisato her new leg and turning her into a Magical Girl. He was killed by Asuka during the battle at the 6th Naha.

Other Characters

A colonel of the JGSDF who heads up the Magical Girl Operations Development Unit; M-Squad for short. The M-Squad is an anti–magic task force which poses as a Maid Café. He is Asuka's legal guardian.

Asuka's civilian classmate who is close friends with Nozomi. She was nearly shot by Kim Kanth, which prompted Asuka to return to being a Magical Girl to save her. She is kidnapped by the Babel Brigade and transformed into a new illegal magical girl, under the name Sehkmet. She died after being separated from the Ring of Ouroboros, which was holding her magic power in check, causing her body to turn to ash. At the end of the manga, however, she is revived by Asuka’s hidden revival magic.

Asuka's bubbly and cheerful civilian classmate and Sayako's friend. Her father works for the Public Safety branch of the police.

Nozomi's father who works for the Public Safety intelligence office and will interrogate - torture - suspects for information.

The firm and cold Commissioner of Public Safety, a woman with wavy brown-red hair and brown eyes. When Nozomi was kidnapped, her superiors refused to mobilize her people as they weren't equipped to handle a magical threat and would not request assistance from JSDF's M-Squad as they believed Nozomi's death could be used politically to secure additional funding without indebting themselves to the armed forces. Working around this, she unofficially partners with Colonel Iizuka since they both know that the Magical Girls are the loophole to this political mess.

The leader of the East Asia United Front terrorist group that orchestrated a massacre in Iidabashi.

 A young Armenian witch hired by a Russian mafia as protection while they illegally traded for magical items. She has a magical item that lets her throw fireballs. She was defeated by Asuka and later interrogated and tortured by Kurumi, who starts treating her like a dog. She and Chisato are recruited to be traded to Commissioner Miura for her newly-created magical response force.
 / 

An Okinawan girl who used to be a karate student before losing her leg in an accident that also killed her mother. Her father tried to offer her to the sex industry for money. She eventually becomes a Magical Girl for Babel Brigade and is given a new prosthetic leg. Her magical device is a bracelet that turns into a whip or bandage around her hand to increase the strength of her blows. It is later revealed Babel was behind the car accident as they could sense her magical potential and wanted to stress her enough to make her into a Magical Girl that would join them. She is captured by Kurumi and eventually joins Miura's new squad along with Nazani.

Disas
Throughout the series various types of disas appear. While they usually have characteristics of stuffed animals stronger ones resemble slasher movie icons. Their danger classes pay homage to many horror villains like Jason Voorhees and Michael Myers.

Media

Manga
Makoto Fukami and Seigo Tokiya began publishing the series in Square Enix’s Monthly Big Gangan in February 2015. The series was licensed in English by Seven Seas Entertainment in January 2017.

Fourteen tankōbon volumes have been released  in Japan. Ten volumes have been released in English so far.

Anime

An anime television series adaptation was announced on July 20, 2018. The anime series is directed by Hideyo Yamamoto and animated by Liden Films, with Makoto Fukami and Norimitsu Kaihō writing the scripts, Yoko Suzuki designing the characters and R.O.N composing the music. It aired from January 12 to March 30, 2019 on MBS and TBS before airing later on BS-TBS, AT-X, CBC. The opening theme is "Kodo" by Nonoc and the ending theme is "Rebel Flag" by Garnidelia. Crunchyroll streamed the series, while Funimation produced an English dub. In Australia and New Zealand, the series is simulcasting on AnimeLab.

Reception
The first volume was reviewed by an overall positive review by Rebecca Silverman of Anime News Network. With an overall grade of B−, Silverman stated “The dark magical girl story may not be new, but Magical Girl Special Ops Asuka shows that it's still a genre with potential. Alternately relying on and eschewing genre tropes, Asuka's struggle with her violent past and magical girl identity stands to be both exciting and psychologically interesting.” She was most critical concerning the relying on tropes without fully committing to the unique characteristics of the storyline and the inconsistency in the artwork. This inconsistency was mostly with the characteristics of main heroine which contributes to overtly sexualizing the character.

Gadget Tsūshin listed "magical spanking", a phrase from the anime's eighth episode, in their 2019 anime buzzwords list.

References

External links
 

2019 anime television series debuts
Animeism
Crunchyroll anime
Fiction about monsters
Funimation
Gangan Comics manga
Liden Films
Magical girl anime and manga
Military anime and manga
Seven Seas Entertainment titles
Seinen manga
Terrorism in fiction